This article is about the video game market and culture in Belgium.

Consumer availability

Distribution
Distribution in Belgium is usually done by publishers that cover the entire Benelux, although some of the publishers' offices are located in Belgium. Since not every publisher has a separate office for the Benelux, certain publishers take care of multiple labels, including those of other publishers.

Rating
Belgium supports the PEGI rating system but there is no legislative basis. PEGI was developed and is owned by the Interactive Software Federation of Europe which is based in Brussels.

Sales
In 2011, the Belgian consumer bought 6.54 million games. More than 84% of those games were console games. The sales generated a revenue of 220 million euro, which means they stayed stable compared to 2010.

Belgium's appearance in video games

Belgium as a setting
Belgium is not often used as an originally created setting for video games, although it does appear in some types of simulation games.

World War II games
The famous Battle of the Bulge is featured in the following video games:
 Battle of the Bulge, various wargames simulating the battle.
 Call of Duty: United Offensive, the American campaign is set during the Battle of the Bulge.
 Medal of Honor: European Assault, the final campaign is set at the start of the Battle.
 Bulge '44 (HPS Simulations) An operational level strategy wargame, covering many scenarios, both historic and alternative.
 Call of Duty: WWII, Battle of the Bulge, Ardennes map in multiplayer

Racing games
 Circuit de Spa-Francorchamps is a popular racing circuit. It's the host of the Belgian Grand Prix and has been featured in many Formula One games and other racing games like Need for Speed: Shift, Race Driver: Grid, Forza Motorsport 5 and Gran Turismo.

Belgian video game characters

 Anna from the game Valiant Hearts: The Great War is a nurse who was born in Ypres
 In most of the international sports games, such as the FIFA football games and olympic video games, teams or players from Belgium are featured.
 Phillipe Loren, one of Saints Row The Third's villains is of Belgian origin.
 Sens from the game Rainbow 6 Siege

Video games based on Belgian works
Many video games are based on Belgian comic books:

 XIII
 Video games based on The Adventures of Tintin
 Video games based on The Smurfs
 Largo Winch: Empire Under Threat
 Spirou
 Video games based on Lucky Luke

Video game development

Representation
The Belgian Entertainment Association (BEA) is the organization that represents the interests of the music, video and video game industries in Belgium.

The Flemish Games Association (FLEGA) represents the Flemish video game industry, The Brussels-Capital Region Games Association (games.brussels) represents the Brussels video game industry, the Walloon Games Association (WALGA) represents the Walloon video game industry.

Game developers from Belgium 

There are 64 game developers registered with the Flemish Games Association. Some of the game development studios in Belgium include:

Defunct game developers

Games developed in Belgium

 Adventure Rock
 Ary and the Secret of Seasons
 Battle for Donetsk
 Baldur's Gate III
 Beyond Divinity
 Divine Divinity
 Divinity II: Ego Draconis
 Divinity II: Flames of Vengeance
 Divinity II: The Dragon Knight Saga
 Divinity: Dragon Commander
 Divinity: Original Sin
 Divinity: Original Sin II
 Hyperball Racing
 Sunset
 The Endless Forest
 The Graveyard
 The Path
 Woolfe: The Red Hood Diaries
 Outcast

Game publishers from Belgium

Education

University college

Other
Syntra LIMBURG offers multiple video game courses.

Media

Print media

Television

Programs

Defunct Programs

Defunct Channels

 GUNKtv

Online media
 eurogamer.be
 9lives.be
 Sensei Gaming
 Les Players Du Dimanche
 N-Gamz
 4WeAreGamers
 GameBrain
 Belgian Games Industry (Companies list)

References